Kusanti Abdul-Salaam, birth name Andy Colbert, (born March 29, 1975) is a former Arena Football wide receiver/defensive back who played for the Portland Forest Dragons, Oklahoma Wranglers, Tampa Bay Storm and Georgia Force. He played college football at UCLA.

Highschool
Kusanti attended John Muir High School. He lettered in football where he played quarterback and defensive back, track where he was a sprinter and hurdler, and basketball where he played point guard. He received a full scholarship to UCLA.

Name change
After a 35–17 loss to Arizona Andy Colbert changed his name to Kusanti Abdul-Salaam due to his conversion to the Islamic faith. The name literally means: "He that is servant of Allah, with peace and salvation."

Post career
After college Abdul-Salaam went to Denmark to play professional football. In Denmark he played Runningback, Wide Receiver, and Defensive Back.

Portland Forest Dragons
Kusanti played for the Portland Forest Dragons in 1999.

Oklahoma Wranglers
Kusanti played with former UCLA team mate kicker Chris Sailer.

Georgia Force
In 2001, Kusanti was the pick in the 2nd round of the 2001 Arena Football League dispersal draft by the Georgia Force, a new franchise team that year.

Personal
Kusanti graduated with a B.A. in History. He works as a barber and also provides home health care for the handicap. He is currently working to become a professor in History. In 2008, he began coaching for the Pasadena Polytechnical School.

References

1975 births
Living people
American football wide receivers
American football defensive backs
UCLA Bruins football players
Portland Forest Dragons players
Oklahoma Wranglers players
Tampa Bay Storm players
Georgia Force players
Players of American football from Pasadena, California